Rugby Viadana 1970 is an Italian rugby union club based in Viadana (province of Mantua,  Lombardy). The club was established in 1970, and has since won the Italian championship in 2002, and the Coppa Italia three times. They also compete in European rugby competitions and were runners-up in the European Shield in 2004. Viadana plays in yellow and black. The club did not compete professionally between 2010 and 2012 as they focused their efforts on Aironi. Aironi was based at Viadana's home ground and represented a number of regional teams in the multi-national Celtic League. The FIR withdrew Aironi's licence to play at the end of the 2012, so Viadana reformed as a professional team will play in Italy's top division, the National championship of Excellence, from the 2012–13 season and currently in the Top12.

History
They were founded in 1970 as a rugby sector in the Vitellianense Cebogas Multisports Club by some ex Rugby Parma F.C. players. They started in the lowest possible league, Serie D.

In 1980–81 Viadana won Serie B but after three years the team were relegated back to Serie C. But they bounced back the following year and won promotion back to Serie B. 1986–87 they won promotion to Serie A2 and finished sixth in their first year. However they were relegated back the following year and didn't return for three years.

They finally won promotion to Serie A in 1998–99. In their first season Arix Viadana won the Coppa Italia and made it to the semifinal of the playoffs. In 2000–01 they finished third in the league but again lost in the semifinal playoffs to Benetton Treviso.

In 2002 the Italian championship was reformed with the birth of Super 10 (now Top12). During this season Arix Viadana finished first and beat favourites Benetton Treviso, in the playoffs, and Calvisano, in the final, to win the title of Italian champion for the first time. They were the first team from outside a provincial capital to do so. They won the Coppa Italia a second time in 2003.

In 2004 they became the first Italian team to have made the final of a European competition when they lost the European Shield final 19-25 to Montpellier. In 2007 they defeated Cammi Calvisano to win their third Coppa Italia. In 2008, despite their relatively experienced team, Viadana were beaten in the semifinals by Benetton Treviso and subsequently lost out on a lucrative Heineken Cup place. In the 2008–09 and 2009–10 Super 10 seasons Montepaschi Viadana reaches the final championship, losing both times against Benetton Treviso.

Viadana were the largest shareholders in Aironi, a new team that competed in the 2010–11 and 2012–12 Celtic League. Many of the club's top players joined Aironi on its formation. As of June 2010 it was announced that will the impending establishment of Aironi the club would no longer compete as a professional club. The Senior and Under 20 teams would be merged with GranDucato Parma Rugby. Viadana would continue as an independent club but only below Under 20 level.

At the end of the 2012 Aironi's licence to play in the Pro12 was withdrawn by the FIR. Aironi's place in the Pro12 was taken by newly formed Zebre, a team based in Parma. Many Aironi players joined Zebre on its formation.

Viadana was then reformed as a semi-professional team for the 2012–13 season of the National championship of Excellence, the reformed Italian championship from 2010, with a number of Aironi's players joining them, as well as the head coach Rowland Phillips. They won three titles of the Excellence Trophy in the 2012–13, 2015–16 and 2016–17 seasons.

The 2012–13 was the last season of Silvano Melegari, and of the Arix Group, as president of the club, after 20 years of history. In the summer of 2014, a new company is at the helm of the team, the Rugby Viadana 1970 S.r.l., founded to keep the club at the highest national level, despite economic difficulties. They currently compete in Top12.

Honours
 Italian championship
 Champions (1): 2001–02
 Runners-up (3): 2006–07, 2008–09, 2009–10
 Coppa Italia
 Champions (3): 1999–2000, 2002–03, 2006–07
 Runners-up (2): 2003–04, 2004–05
 Excellence Trophy
 Champions (3): 2012–13, 2015–16, 2016–17
 European Shield
 Runners-up (1): 2003–04

Current squad
The Viadana squad for 2022–23:

Selected former players

Italian players
Former players who have played for Viadana and have caps for Italy:

  Matías Agüero 
  Andrea Benatti 
  Cristian Bezzi
  Luca Bigi
  Giorgio Bronzini
  Pablo Canavosio
  Sandro Ceppolino
  Carlo Del Fava
  Santiago Dellapè
  Jaco Erasmus
  Ignacio Fernández Rouyet
  Joshua Furno
  Quintin Geldenhuys
  Andrea Masi
  Matteo Mazzantini
  Ian McKinley 
  Andrea Moretti 
  Carlos Nieto
  Corrado Pilat
  Samuele Pace
  Gilberto Pavan
  Riccardo Pavan
  Roberto Pedrazzi
  Aaron Persico
  Matthew Phillips
  Matteo Pratichetti
  Roberto Quartaroli
  Juan Manuel Queirolo
  Kaine Robertson
  Lorenzo Romano
  Federico Ruzza
  Diego Saccà
  Mario Savi
  Stefano Saviozzi
  Michele Sepe
  Josh Sole
  Cherif Traorè
  Pietro Travagli

Overseas players
Former players who have played for Viadana and have caps for their respective country:

  Germán Araoz
  Julio-César García
  Juan Cruz Guillemaín
  Javier Rojas
  Tom Bowman
  Lloyd Johansson
  Phil Murphy
  Tom Beim
  Isoa Neivua
 – Luca Tramontin
  Dion Waller
  Mark Finlay
  Brett Harvey
  Sam Harding
  Tana Umaga
  Daniel Farani
  Dominic Fe'aunati
  Ali Koko
  Siaosi Vaili
  Stuart Moffat
  Inoke Afeaki
  Pierre Hola
  Dave Tiueti
  Nick Civetta
  Adrian Durston
  Sonny Parker

Statistics

European Challenge Cup (1996–2014)

European Shield

Heineken Cup (1995–2014)

References

External links
 Official site

Italian rugby union teams
Rugby clubs established in 1970
1970 establishments in Italy
Sport in Lombardy